Eleanor of Sicily (1325–1375) was Queen of Aragon from 1349 until 1375 as the third wife of King Peter IV.

Early life 
Eleanor was the daughter of Peter II of Sicily and Elisabeth of Carinthia. She was the second of eight children, six of whom survived to adulthood.

Queen of Aragon 

Eleanor married in Valencia on 27 August 1349 to Peter IV of Aragon, on the condition that he renounce all rights to any Sicilian Crown. He was twice-widowed, had two surviving daughters: Constance and Joanna but no surviving sons.

Eleanor became a powerful influence at the Aragonese court, replacing Bernardo de Cabrera as Peter's chief adviser.

Eleanor's brother Frederick III the Simple, married Constance of Aragon (Eleanor's stepdaughter). Frederick and Constance had a daughter, Maria, but no sons. Then in 1357 Frederick proposed to transfer the duchies of Athens and Neopatria to Eleanor in return for military help from her husband in Sicily, but was refused.

In 1373 Eleanor's eldest son John married Martha of Armagnac, a calm and conciliatory woman. Eleanor treated Martha as her own daughter.

By 1374, Eleanor founded and patronized the Poor Clares convent at Teruel. It was furnished with an annual income and a 20,000 sous construction donation. The convent employed 15 to 20 nuns to pray for the souls of her parents.
 
Upon a stay at her home in Empordà, Eleanor made Sibila of Fortia her lady-in-waiting; she eventually married Eleanor's widower.

Death
In Lérida on 20 April 1375, Eleanor died leaving her husband a widower and her three surviving children. Her husband remarried to Sibila, a girl that was over thirty years his junior. Most of the family, including Eleanor's children, came into conflict with Sibila.

Issue
Eleanor and Peter had four children:
 John I of Aragon (1350–1396), succeeded his father and was father himself of Yolande of Aragon, however he had no male issue so the throne passed to his younger brother
 Martin I of Aragon (1356–1410), succeeded John but had no surviving issue
 Eleanor (1358–1382), who married John I of Castile and was the mother of Ferdinand I of Aragon.
 Alfonso (1362–1364), died young

References

Sources

External link

1325 births
1375 deaths
House of Aragon
House of Barcelona (Sicily)
Aragonese queen consorts
Countesses of Barcelona
Majorcan queens consort
14th-century Sicilian people
14th-century Italian women
People of Byzantine descent
Burials at the Poblet Monastery
Daughters of kings